Samuela Tuikiligana (born 1958) is a Fijian international lawn bowler.

In 2008 he won the silver medal in the triples at the 2008 World Outdoor Bowls Championship in Christchurch along with Curtis Mar and Keshwa Goundar.

He won the gold medal in the triples with Semesa Naiseruvati and Daniel Lum On at the 2011 Asia Pacific Bowls Championships in Adelaide.

References

Fijian male bowls players
1958 births
Living people
People from Lakeba